Anglo-Saxon Petroleum Co Ltd is a private company owned by Royal Dutch Shell.

History
Around 1898 the company became responsible for the ships of Shell Transport and Trading. In 1907 it continued to be responsible for the trade in oil by-products when the Dutch Petroleum Company was established to take over the petroleum business of the Dutch state authorities and the Shell company. The same year it was incorporated into Royal Dutch Shell. In 1908 Shell Transport and Trading had placed all of its assets in Anglo-Saxon Petroleum Co and Bataafsche Petroleum Maatschappij which also held all of the assets of Royal Dutch Shell. Since then the company owned and ran the oil transport and storage activities of the Shell group of companies. During the following two decades Anglo-Saxon became the most progressive, innovative and forward-looking of all the oil carriers. In order to match transport demand, they commissioned new buildings based on their own design or, indeed, bought and re-designed existing ships with an amazing degree of innovative thinking and fantasy. Liner ships, general cargo vessels, sailing ships and even train ferries were re-built and made into oil carriers.

In November 1955 The Shell Petroleum Company Ltd. took over the assets of Anglo-Saxon, which ceased to function as a separate company.

Managing Directors appointed 1907-1946
General managing directors of Royal Dutch and chairmen of Shell Transport are marked
with an asterisk - see the appropriate list above for their dates in office. In November 1955 The
Shell Petroleum Company Ltd. took over the assets of Anglo-Saxon, which ceased to function
as a separate company.

Arnold J. Cohen Stuart                                     1 July 1907 – 1 January 1915
• Marcus Samuel (first Viscount Bearsted)                  1 July 1907 – 21 June 1921
(Sir) Robert Waley Cohen                                   1 July 1907 – 19 December 1928        
• Henri Wilhelm August Deterding                           1 July 1907 – 31 December 1936
Hendrikus Colijn                                           1 January 1921 – 31 March 1922
Sir Andrew Agnew             1 October 1922 – 31 December 1922
Ir. Jean Baptist August Kessler                       1 November 1922 – 30 June 1948
• Frederick Godber                                         1 February 1929 – 12 July 1946
(first Lord Godber of Mayfield)
Jan Carel van Panthaleon Baron van Eck                     1 January 1937 – 31 December 1946
(Sir) George Legh-Jones                                    1 January 1938 – 30 July 1951
• Drs. Barthold T. W. van Hasselt                          20 July 1944 – 31 December 1951
Hon. (Sir) Francis Hopwood                                 19 July 1946 - November 1955
(second Lord Southborough)

References

External links
 

 
 
 

 

Oil and gas companies of the United Kingdom
Multinational oil companies
Chemical companies of the United Kingdom
Companies based in the London Borough of Lambeth
Non-renewable resource companies established in 1907
1907 establishments in England
Automotive fuel retailers
Energy companies established in 1907
British companies established in 1907